"Manic Depression" is a song written by Jimi Hendrix and recorded by the Jimi Hendrix Experience in 1967. Music critic William Ruhlmann describes the lyrics as "more an expression of romantic frustration than the clinical definition of manic depression."

The song is performed in an uptempo triple metre.  It also features Mitch Mitchell's jazz-influenced drumming. and a parallel guitar and bass line.

"Manic Depression" is included on the Experience's debut album, Are You Experienced (1967). Recordings of live performances have been released on BBC Sessions (1998) and Winterland (2011). Ruhlmann notes renditions by Seal with Jeff Beck on Stone Free: A Tribute to Jimi Hendrix (1993) and King's X on Dogman (1994).

The Canadian band Nomeansno included a cover of the song in their EP You Kill Me. A live version is also featured in the bootleg Live in Warsaw.

References

1967 songs
Songs written by Jimi Hendrix
The Jimi Hendrix Experience songs
Song recordings produced by Chas Chandler